Back Benchers (Class ka Pehla Din) is an Indian celebrity quiz show hosted by film producer and director, Farah Khan. The show debuted on Flipkart Video in October 2019, featuring Anil Kapoor and Shilpa Shetty as the first guests.

Overview
Back Benchers is a non-fiction show which features Bollywood celebrities as students. Back Benchers is the first original series from Flipkart Video and can be watched for free on the Flipkart app in the Flipkart Video section. The show is hosted by Farah Khan who portrays the dean of the school. Every episode sees stars trying to get the position of a Back Bencher in Farah's class. The show puts the guests in the hot seat, testing their general knowledge through a series of oral as well as written tests. Celebrity guests can score marks on every right answer across three different rounds, additionally, guests can also score grace marks as awarded by Dean Farah Khan upon performing entertaining acts during the show. The series consists of 20 episodes in its first season and the first episode was broadcast on Flipkart on October 19, 2019.

Regular Segments
The show consists of three segments, after each round, the scores are revealed and the guest with the most points wins

Oral test: In this round, questions are asked to the guests to test their general knowledge

Written test: The guests are asked to write down their answers on the blackboard

Speed test: The segment includes a rapid-fire Q and A with Farah asking guests a similar set of questions

Step of the day: Farah challenges her guests to replicate a pre-decided step of the day which is then thrown open to TikTok users

Season

During the first season of Back Benchers, several Bollywood celebrities have visited the show and participated in fun and games. The entire list is present

References

External links

Back Benchers on Flipkart

Indian television talk shows
Indian web series
Hindi-language web series
2019 Indian television series debuts
2019 web series debuts
Indian game shows
Celebrity competitions
Flipkart
Quiz shows
Indian reality television series